Daona mansueta is a moth of the family Noctuidae first described by Francis Walker in 1864. It is found in Sri Lanka, Borneo, India, Myanmar, Peninsular Malaysia, the Philippines, Sumbawa, Seram, New Guinea and Australia.

Description
Its ground colour is brownish. An oblique medial dark shade and dark marginal zone are found on the forewing. A faint reddish-brown fasciae is found on the hindwing. The discal mark consists of two black dots.

References

Moths of Asia
Moths described in 1864